Sar Jowshar may refer to:
 Sar Jowshar-e Ahhad
 Sar Jowshar-e Edalat